Samuel Gustafson (born 11 January 1995) is a Swedish professional footballer who plays as a midfielder for BK Häcken and the Sweden national team.

Club career
On 2 September 2019, he signed a multi-year contract with the Serie B club Cremonese.

On 9 July 2021, he returned to BK Häcken on a three-year contract.

International career 
Gustafson represented the Sweden U21 team a total of seven times between 2015 and 2016. He made his full international debut for Sweden on 16 November 2022 in a friendly game against Mexico, playing the full 90 minutes in a 2–1 win.

Personal life
His twin brother, Simon, also a footballer, is Samuel's teammate at BK Häcken.

Career statistics

Club

International

Honours
BK Häcken

 Allsvenskan: 2022

Svenska Cupen: 2016

References

External links

1995 births
Living people
Association football midfielders
BK Häcken players
Torino F.C. players
A.C. Perugia Calcio players
Hellas Verona F.C. players
Allsvenskan players
U.S. Cremonese players
Serie A players
Serie B players
Swedish footballers
Sweden under-21 international footballers
Swedish expatriate footballers
Expatriate footballers in Italy
Swedish twins
Twin sportspeople